William Cullen Stevens (August 29, 1848 – October 2, 1897) was an American merchant and politician from New York.

Life 
Stevens was born on August 29, 1848 in Moira New York, the son of Simon Dwight Stevens and Susan Burdick. His brother was newspaper publisher and assemblyman Halbert D. Stevens.

Stevens moved with his parents to Bangor, Maine when he was a few months old, later returning to Moira. At a young age, he started working as a store clerk in Moira. He then worked as a traveling salesman. He then became a commercial traveller for the wholesale crockery house Abram, French & Co. In 1874, he moved to Malone, became the senior member of the firm Stevens, Bowen & Co, and opened a hardware store. He later formed a new partnership with W. F. Symonds and opened a dry goods store. He disposed of his interest in 1889, when he was elected to the Assembly.

Stevens was a trustee of the village of Malone. In 1888, he was elected to the New York State Assembly as a Republican, representing Franklin County. He served in the Assembly in 1889, 1890, and 1891. While in the Assembly, he obtained appropriations for the Northern New York Institute for Deaf Mutes, which he helped found and took a deep interest in. He then worked as the financial clerk in the Assembly in 1894, 1895, 1896, and 1897. In between Assembly sessions as financial clerk, he worked as a salesman for the Lawrence-Webter Company of Malone.

Stevens was a member of the Methodist Episcopal Church. In 1873, he married the eldest daughter of Wallace H. Webster. Their children were Mabel, Jennie, Susie, and Wallace H.

Stevens died at home from heart failure on October 2, 1897, the day after he was appointed chairman of the Republican county committee. He was buried in Morningside Cemetery in Malone.

References

External links 
The Political Graveyard

1848 births
1897 deaths
People from Moira, New York
People from Malone, New York
American merchants
19th-century American politicians
Republican Party members of the New York State Assembly
Members of the Methodist Episcopal Church
Burials in New York (state)
19th-century American businesspeople